Memot District is a district (srok) in Tboung Khmum Province, Cambodia.

The district is easily accessed by road from Kampong Cham or Kratié. Though there are numerous smaller roads within the district that cross the border into Vietnam, there is no official international border crossing within the district. Memot town lies on National Highway 7 near the midpoint between Kampong Cham and Kratié.

Location 
Memot district is the most easterly district in Tboung Khmum Province and shares a border with Vietnam. Reading from the north clockwise, Memot shares a border with Preaek Prasab and Snuol districts of Kratié Province to the north. The eastern border of the district is shared with the Vietnamese Province of Bình Phước, while Tây Ninh Province of Vietnam is to the south. The western border of the district abuts Ponhea Kraek and Dambae districts of Tboung Khmum province.

Prehistoric civilisation 
Memot has given its name to a prehistoric culture that lived in the area some 2500 years ago. The Memotian culture is the name given to a series of archaeological sites found in Memot and across the border in Vietnam. The district is home to a number of prehistoric sites which have only recently been studied. In 1959, French archaeologist Louis Malleret first described a series of 17 circular earthworks, each with an outer wall and an inner ditch. He reported this new category of prehistoric sites in the red soil region east of the Mekong in what was then part of Kampong Cham Province and in Vietnam. In 1962, Bernard Philippe Groslier carried out excavations in a circular earthwork near Memot, later called the Groslier site, and named this civilisation "Mimotien". The Memot Circular Earthworks span across the red soil region of eastern Cambodia and the border of Vietnam. To date 36 of these massive prehistoric villages have been discovered in Cambodia. Radiocarbon dating of fragments of glass bangles found at one site gives evidence for a first millennium B.C. date. In 2010 another site, "Samrong Circular Earthwork", was unintentionally destroyed by bulldozers to make way for low-cost housing.

Administration 
The following table shows the villages of Memot districts by commune.

Demographics 
The district is divided into 14 communes (khum) and 175 villages (phum). According to the 1998 Census, the population of the district was 111,296 people in 21,775 households in 1998. With a population of over 110,000 people, Memot district had the third largest population in Tboung Khmum province after Ponhea Kraek and Tboung Khmom. The average household size in Memot is 5.1 persons per household, which is slightly lower than the rural average for Cambodia (5.2 persons). The sex ratio in the district is 94.5%, with significantly more females than males.

References 
 http://nis.gov.kh/nis/Census2019/Final%20General%20Population%20Census%202019-English.pdf

External links
Kampong Cham at Royal Government of Cambodia website
Kampong Cham at Ministry of Commerce website

Districts of Tboung Khmum province